Matěj Švancer (born 26 March 2004) is a Czech-Austrian freestyle skier in slopestyle and big air. After great successes at the junior level, including a gold medal at the Winter Youth Olympics and two junior world championship titles, he started for Austria in the 2021–22 season.

Career
In 2020, Švancer won Gold (Big Air) at the Winter Youth Olympics at Leysin.

On 3 November 2019, Švancer made his debut in the FIS Freestyle Ski World Cup in Modena. After further starts in Deštné and Stubaital, he achieved his first top result in 2021 with sixth place in Kreischberg. After his naturalization in March 2020, the switch from the Czech Republic to Austria was approved by the FIS in June 2021 and he was accepted into the Austrian squad. On 22 October 2021, he beat Canadian Teal Harle at the big air in Chur with 99.0 points and thus celebrated his first World Cup victory. Six weeks later he also won the second and final Big Air World Cup of the season in Steamboat Springs, Colorado.

References

External links
 

2004 births
Living people
Sportspeople from Prague
Austrian male freestyle skiers
Czech male freestyle skiers
Freestyle skiers at the 2020 Winter Youth Olympics
Medalists at the 2020 Winter Youth Olympics
Freestyle skiers at the 2022 Winter Olympics
Olympic freestyle skiers of Austria
Youth Olympic gold medalists for the Czech Republic
Czech emigrants to Austria
X Games athletes